Amos Breckinridge Corwine (born in Maysville, Kentucky, in 1815; died in New Rochelle, New York, 22 June 1880) was a United States journalist and diplomat.

His early years were spent on his father's plantation in Mississippi. He published the Yazoo Banner from 1840 to 1844. He served during the Mexican–American War as a lieutenant in the Mississippi regiment commanded by Jefferson Davis, and was severely wounded at the Battle of Buena Vista. After that war, in partnership with his brother Samuel, he edited the Cincinnati Chronicle.

During the administrations of Presidents Tyler and Fillmore he was U.S. Consul at Panama. In 1856, he was sent by President Pierce to investigate the Watermelon Riot, and his report was the basis for the treaty and adjustment of damages between the United States and New Granada. He was reappointed consul, and remained in Panama until 1861.

Notes

References
 

1815 births
1880 deaths
19th-century American diplomats
American military personnel of the Mexican–American War
People from Maysville, Kentucky
American consuls
19th-century American journalists
American male journalists
19th-century American male writers